KazEOSat is a remote sensing Earth observation satellite built for the Kazakhstan Gharysh Sapary under an agreement with EADS Astrium and SSTL, a satellite manufacturing companies in France and England, respectively. The earth observation satellite was designed and developed by EADS Astrium, and represent 11th launch of SSTL-150 bus, first launched in 2005.

References

External links

 KAzEOSat 2 launch announcement

Spacecraft launched in 2014
Satellites of Kazakhstan
Spacecraft launched by Dnepr rockets